The Mysteries of Paris (French: Les mystères de Paris) is a 1943 French drama film directed by Jacques de Baroncelli and starring Marcel Herrand, Yolande Laffon and Alexandre Rignault. It is based on the novel The Mysteries of Paris by Eugène Sue.

The film's art direction was by Léon Barsacq.

Cast

References

Bibliography 
 Goble, Alan. The Complete Index to Literary Sources in Film. Walter de Gruyter, 1999.

External links 
 

1943 films
1940s French-language films
Films directed by Jacques de Baroncelli
French drama films
1943 drama films
French black-and-white films
1940s French films